Thomas Porter Gunning (June 26, 1882 – November 9, 1943) was an American dentist and politician.

Gunning was born near Neponset, Illinois; he received his degree in dentistry from the Chicago College of Dental Surgery in 1905. Gunning then practiced dentistry in Princeton, Illinois. Gunning served on the Princeton City Council and as mayor. He was a Republican. Gunning served in the Illinois Senate from 1931 until his death in 1943. Gunning died in a hospital in Princeton, Illinois from complications due to surgery.

In 1936, he unsuccessfully sought the Republican nomination for governor.

Notes

External links

1882 births
1943 deaths
People from Princeton, Illinois
American dentists
Mayors of places in Illinois
Illinois city council members
Republican Party Illinois state senators
20th-century American politicians
20th-century dentists